Damian I (July 10, 1848 – August 14, 1931) was Greek Orthodox Patriarch of Jerusalem from 1897 to 1931.

Literature 
 f. E: Dowling. The Orthodox Greek Patriarchate of Jerusalem. London: 1913, 27-36.
 Maximos Philadelpheias: Πατριάρχης Ιεροσσολύμων Δαμιανός. In: Ορθοδοξία 6 (1931) 453–462.

1848 births
1931 deaths
19th-century Greek Orthodox Patriarchs of Jerusalem
20th-century Greek Orthodox Patriarchs of Jerusalem